L'odore della notte may refer to:

 L'odore della notte (novel), a 2001 novel
 L'odore della notte (film), a 1998 crime film